The Magic School Bus is a series of educational software video games developed by Music Pen and published by Microsoft via their Microsoft Home brand. The interactive adventures are part of the larger franchise and based on The Magic School Bus book series and public television series (which originally aired on PBS).

Development
Most of the original software games were created by the software company Music Pen Multimedia in collaboration with Microsoft and Scholastic Press, the publisher of the Magic School Bus book series. Scholastic, which created the "Magic School Bus" television series on PBS, licensed its content to Microsoft. To access the home market, Microsoft created a video game brand called Microsoft Home, and a software series was created under that umbrella. At the time, many companies lacked the expertise to develop multimedia project so turned to smaller new media companies. The company hired the garage shop Music Pen to create a program, a company started 15 years prior by concert pianist Wu and composer Philip Lui who wrote programs that taught music comprehension. After the contract, Music Pen grew from 5 people to 40, and was based in New York. The games were based on the books and the PBS show.

By 1997, Microsoft Home was struggling due to a crowded market. In 1998, Scholastic's The Magic School Bus Adventure Series Volumes 1, 2 and 3 were announced.

The team received feedback from teachers and parents to inform their products. The series won: Software Publisher's Association Codie award for Best Elementary Educational titles and the National Parenting Center Seal of Approval. Most recently, Scholastic's The Magic School Bus CD-ROM series by Microsoft received the FamilyPC Family Tested Software Recommended Seal in the education category and was named Top Picks of 1997 by the Toy Testing Council.

Like the TV series, the bus was animated in the usual way, in the CD-ROM games, it is typically animated with computer generated imagery (or "CGI"). In all these titles the user gets to "drive" the bus, which almost always involves clicking on the steering wheel and choosing a location. (The exception is The Magic School Bus Explores Inside the Earth where it is the gear shift instead of the steering wheel.) Most of the games in the original software were based with the book series (the original series books) and TV series. Most of the games also have seven different locations, including the classroom. There is some goal to find a specific number of missing collectibles for the user in almost every game (with the exception of The Magic School Bus Explores the Human Body). In the other games, there is a "missing collectible" minigame where the player has to find three or four missing collectibles. The video game series (both original titles and activity centers) are targeted for children ages 5–10.

The games include activities to assist the player's learning.

System requirements vary among the games. Games with the Macintosh indication can be used on a Macintosh LC 550 or newer with a minimum of System 7.1, 8 MB RAM, 8 MB hard disk space, color monitor, and 2X CD-ROM drive.

Original Software

The Magic School Bus Explores the Solar System (1994)
 
This game is based on both the book The Magic School Bus Lost in the Solar System (from the classic series books) and episode The Magic School Bus Gets Lost in Space. The user flies the bus to their chosen planet and play experiments and click on things there. To win the game, the user has to discover the whereabouts of Ms. Frizzle. To do so they have to play a "whatsit" game to earn a token (for a total of three clues) in order to find Ms. Frizzle which gives them a clue as to which planet Ms. Frizzle is on. Once Ms. Frizzle is found, the bus will return to the classroom and the game begins again. All nine planets and Earth's Moon can be visited. When the gas giants are visited, the bus lands on one of their moons.

The game was one of the chosen few "highly visual scholastic programs" in the Citrus Country library System's new youth CD-ROM station in 1997. The Spokesman-Review deemed it a "fact-and-fun filled ride".

The Magic School Bus Explores the Human Body (1994, Macintosh; 1995, Windows 95)
This game is based on the book The Magic School Bus Inside the Human Body and the episode The Magic School Bus for Lunch. Arnold has become the class' next field trip. The user can drive the bus to 12 different organs. In some locations, the player can leave the bus. Each place has an arcade game and a science experiment and a lot to explore. This is the first game that allows the user to sign in and go to the back of the bus. This is also one of the few games in which Liz can talk. This is the only game to not have a "missing collectible" minigame (where the player must find a specific and fixed number of missing collectibles).

Both Quandary and All Game Guide gave the game 70/100. Superkids gave it 3.5/5 stars.

The Milwaukee Sentinel was bemused that the program got a kindergartner playtester interested in the small intestines. Bangor Daily News deemed it a "splendid mix of experiments, explanations, and games". The Daily Gazette deemed it "delightful". The Boston Globe tested the problem on the latest Compaq Presario computer, yet experience game-breaking technical issues; the newspaper therefore commented that "Microsoft should be ashamed of itself". The Economist said the game was less informative than DK Multimedia titles. The game was the 6th most popular education titles in the education category sold in Software Etc. and Babbage's stores in the Washington area in the week ending September 27, 1997.

The Magic School Bus Explores the Ocean (1995, Macintosh)
This game is based on The Magic School Bus on the Ocean Floor and the episode The Magic School Bus Gets Eaten (including its TV tie in book adaptation). This is one of the two games which is based with any book from the TV tie in books, with the other being The Magic School Bus Explores Inside the Earth. The class has taken a field trip to the beach; here they find a message in a bottle, which contains clues (three clues) to a treasure. The user explores the ocean and follows clues that lead him/her to the treasure. This was the first CD-ROM that featured the entire cast on the bus and is the only game where the classroom cannot be visited. A Nintendo DS version was released in 2011.

The game won an award for Home PC - Holiday Gift Guide - The Best Programs of 1996. The Cedartown Standard praised the game for combining fun with education.

The Magic School Bus Explores Inside the Earth (1996)
This game is based on the book The Magic School Bus Inside the Earth and the episode The Magic School Bus Blows Its Top (and its TV tie in book adaptation). Arnold has lost some of the rocks and minerals in his collection. He is missing four rocks. The user (who has to find four missing rocks) explores several places such as a canyon, a geode, a fault, a volcano, and an undersea environment; the undersea environment features a subduction zone, a mid-ocean ridge, and an underwater volcano. The user can collect rocks in various ways. The goal is to find replacements for the rocks and minerals Arnold lost.

Superkids gave the game a score of 4.3/5. Alamo PC Organization wrote that "the program is both educating and entertaining".

The Magic School Bus Explores in the Age of Dinosaurs (1996)
This game (in the original software series) is based on the book The Magic School Bus in the Time of the Dinosaurs and the episode The Magic School Bus The Busasaurus. This is the last game in the software which is based with books from the book series.

Ms. Frizzle's photo album is missing three snapshots of prehistoric animals (from a specific album; meat eating dinosaurs, plant eating dinosaurs, and prehistoric reptiles that aren't dinosaurs). The user travels back in time with her class, to seven different dinosaur locations, in order to search for live dinosaurs and help replace the photographs. When the player finds all three photographs, they are awarded with a mask of a prehistoric animal (matching to an animal from that specific album; either Tyrannosaurus rex, Brachiosaurus, or Pterodactylus).

For saving the game, unique to just this game, if the player has too many driver's license panels saved up already, if they decide to quit and save the game, they can (before exiting) choose an old driver's license to replace/discard to make room for the new file. Also, this is the first of the four games which has a CC (closed captioning) option—to turn subtitles on or off.

Both All Game Guide and Quandary gave it 70/100. Metzomagic gave it 3.5/5 stars.

Microsoft donated copies of the game to high school students via the University of Maine Upward Bound Program.

The Magic School Bus Explores the Rainforest (1997)
The class is decorating their classroom for "Rainforest Day". Wanda brought a "Right-Away-Rainforest Toolbox" that could do the job, but some "bio-clones" (four of them) are missing from the kit. Ms. Frizzle takes the class on a field trip to the Costa Rican rainforest to find the missing bio-clones. This game is the first one in the original software to be not based with any books from the book series. However (like the other five previous games in the software), it is based with TV episodes from the cartoon series. This game is based with the TV episode The Magic School Bus In the Rainforest. But it is the last game to be based with any adaptation. This is also the last game to be created by Music Pen.

All Game Guide gave it 80/100. Harfort Courant thought "Even on a slower PC, the game was fun and interesting".

The Magic School Bus Explores Bugs (1999)
This is the first game in the software series to replace the original voice actors of the eight children from the TV series. This is the first of the two games in the original software which is not based with any adaptation (book series, TV series, and TV tie in books). In this game, The children have designed biodomes for a contest, but each pair has lost one of the bugs from their projects. This is the final game in the original software series. Like in The Magic School Bus Explores the World of Animals, this game is not based with any adaptation. The player's task in this game is to find a specimen of each of the four missing bugs in one of four natural habitats. In each habitat, one of the children transforms into a bug; for examples, Arnold turns into an ambush bug when he is in the meadow, Keesha changes into a luna moth when she is in the forest, Ralphie turns into a hercules beetle when he is in the jungle, and Dorothy Ann changes into a mayfly nib when she is in the pond.

The game was given a score of 90/100 by Tech with Kids (Computing with Kids) and 50/100 by Macworld. SuperKids gave it 4.5/5.

Ludington Daily News praised the game for its high quality engaging multimedia and accurate information.

The Magic School Bus Explores the World of Animals (1999)
In this game, the user has to find all four animals (which are placed into their wrong habitats) and send them back to their own (and correct) habitats where they each belong. If the game is played at another time, the player has two options (to "Continue saved game" or "Collect 4 missing collectibles"; the second option "Collect 4 missing collectibles" starts a new game if chosen and the save data from the previous use gets deleted). When traveling to certain habitats, one of the children will be transformed into an animal (for a few examples, Arnold becomes a bullfrog in the swamp, Dorothy Ann becomes an opposumling in the rainforest, Wanda becomes a sea otter in the tundra, and Tim becomes a parrot fish in the reef).

This is the first of the two games in the software to be created by KnowWonder Digital Mediaworks instead of Music Pen Multimedia (since starting with this game, Microsoft stopped collaborating with Music Pen and started collaborating with Know Wonder).

Superkids gave the game a score of 4.7/5.

Bangor Daily News said the game "is jampacked with unusual animals, interesting information, games, puzzles, and experiments".

Activity Centers

Like the final two games from the Magic School Bus original software (The Magic School Bus Explores Bugs and The Magic School Bus Explores the World of Animals), Microsoft for the activity center software games collaborated with KnowWonder Digital Mediaworks.

The Magic School Bus: In Concert Activity Center (2000)
This game was developed by KnowWonder and published by Microsoft.

It received a score of 76/100 by Review Corner and 60/100 by All Game Guide.

The Magic School Bus: Lands on Mars Activity Center (2000)
This game was developed by KnowWonder and published by Microsoft.

It received a score of 77/100 by Review Corner and 50/100 by All Game Guide. Superkids gave it 4.7/5.

The Magic School Bus: Whales and Dolphins Activity Center (2001)
This game was developed by KnowWonder and published by Microsoft.

It received a score of 90/100 by Tech with Kids (Computing with Kids), and 85/100 by Review Corner.

The Magic School Bus: Discovers Flight Activity Center (2001)
This game was developed by KnowWonder and published by Microsoft.

It received a score of 90/100 by Tech with Kids (Computing with Kids). Superkids gave it 4.3/5.

The Magic School Bus: Volcano Adventure Activity Center (2001)
This game was developed by KnowWonder and published by Microsoft.

It received a score of 90/100 by Tech with Kids (Computing with Kids), 83/100 by Review Corner, and 40/100 by Mac Addict.

Sega Genesis
 Scholastic's The Magic School Bus: Space Exploration Game (1995)
 This was the only game created on a medium other than PC CD-ROM, (Sega Genesis). The premise was for the Magic School Bus to select a destination (starting with The Moon and reaching all the way out to Pluto). The game would then follow the same format; Ms. Frizzle would take off into outer space, and the player (sd Phoebe) would have to find her. All missions consisted of flying to the planet (while taking photographs of various space objects, shooting apart meteors, and collecting "space buoys" for fuel), landing the bus on a platform successfully, traversing the planet on foot to find Ms. Frizzle, and putting together a sliding jigsaw puzzle to complete the stage.

Sega-16.com gave it 90/100, while Video Games & Computer Entertainment gave it 60/100.

Sega Pico
 A Sega Pico title under the same name was released in 1995. The game is about going to various places (such as the time of dinosaurs, the Solar System, etc.)

Portable Mobile Games

Nintendo DS

The Magic School Bus: Oceans (2011)
This game was developed by Big Blue Bubble Inc. and published by Scholastic for the Nintendo DS console.

Mobile Smartphone
Published by Scholastic and released on Android and Apple devices as "Touch and tilt" storybooks that included games.

The Magic School Bus: Dinosaurs (2010)
Described an in iterative storybook, the app included a game with "7 different levels that explores where dinosaurs lived around the world."

The Magic School Bus: Oceans (2010)
Described as an interactive storybook, this one "features 1 highly re-playable game that includes over 20 animals in which children can play to earn points for more science facts and to travel to other areas of the ocean."

References

External links
  demo for Classic Mac OS and Classic Environment
Manhattan Turns Into `Silicon Alley' 
INFORMATION TECHNOLOGY: Sound Bytes; From Mao to Multimedia To the Magic School Bus (Published 1995) 
The Message Is the Medium - Education Week 
All aboard the body bus

The Magic School Bus
Children's educational video games
School-themed video games
Science educational video games
Video games developed in the United States
Windows games